Dandidih is a census town in the Giridih CD block in the Giridih Sadar subdivision of  the Giridih district in the Indian state of Jharkhand.

Geography

Location                                   

Area overview
Giridih district is a part of the Chota Nagpur plateau, with rocky soil and extensive forests. Most of the rivers in the district flow from the west to east, except in the northern portion where the rivers flow north and north west. The district has coal and mica mines. It is an overwhelmingly rural district with small pockets of urbanisation.

Note: The map alongside presents some of the notable locations in the district. All places marked in the map are linked in the larger full screen map.

Demographics
According to the 2011 Census of India, Dandidih had a total population of 7,769, of which 4,008 (52%) were males and 3,761 (48%) were females. Population in the age range 0–6 years was 1,446. The total number of literate persons in Dandidih was 4,501 (71.18% of the population over 6 years).

Giridih Urban Agglomeration is composed of Giridih (Nagar Parishad), Paratdih (CT), Sirsia (CT), Pertodih (CT) and Dandidih (CT).

Infrastructure
According to the District Census Handbook 2011, Giridih, Dandidih covered an area of 1.18 km2. Among the civic amenities, it had 6 km roads with open drains, the protected water supply involved tap water from treated sources, hand pump, overhead tank. It had 1,056 domestic electric connections, 2 road light points. Among the educational facilities it had 4 primary schools, 2 middle school, the nearest secondary and senior secondary schools at Harisingh Raidih 1 km away. It had the branch office of 1 nationalised bank, 1 cooperative bank, 1 agricultural credit society, 1 non-agricultural credit society.

References

Cities and towns in Giridih district